Apollon Skalkowski (race. 1 (13) January 1808 Zhytomyr - December 28, 1898 (9 January 1899 Odessa) - Polish-Russian and scientist, historian of Ukrainian descdent. He was a father of a journalist Constantine Skalkovsky.

Life and work
By birth a Pole. He was educated at Vilnius and Moscow universities. He was a member of the Russian Academy of Sciences of the historico-philological department. More than 50 years as head of the Statistics Committee, in Odessa.

AA Skalkovsky became the first historian to systematically study the history of Novorossiysk Territory (Southern Ukraine), for which he received from his contemporaries the nickname "Herodotus Novorossiysk Territory.

Numerous historical works AA Skalkovsky still retain the value of sources on the history of New Russia (Southern Ukraine) and  Zaporozhye Sech, since they are used many valuable documents that are not extant.

The position of the scientist in motion estimation Haidamaks provoked a rebuke T. Shevchenko in his poem "Cold Yar.

Collaborated in the Journal of the Ministry of Education ", where issued, including oral histories NA A. Korzh.

In addition to historical works, Apollo Skalkovsky dabbled in the literary soil. Author of historical novels "Kagalnichanka", "Crystal Beam," "Brothers Redeemer," "Mama".

Major works 
 «Хронологическое обозрение истории Новороссийского края, 1730—1823», т.1-2, Одесса 1836—1838
 «Опыт статистического описания Новороссийского края», т.1-2, Одесса 1850–1853.
 «История Новой Сечи или последнего коша Запорожского», т.1-3, Одесса 1885—1886
 «Наезды гайдамак на Западную Украину в XVIII столетии, 1733—1768», Одесса 1845

Literature 
 Боровой С. Я. «А. А. Скальковский и его работы по истории Южной Украины», «Зап. Одес.археологич.об-ва», 1960, т. 1
 его же, «Про економічні погляди А. О. Скальковського», в кн."З історії економічної думки на Україні", Київ 1961.

1808 births
1898 deaths
Writers from Zhytomyr
People from Volhynian Governorate
People from the Russian Empire of Polish descent
19th-century Ukrainian historians
Vilnius University alumni
Corresponding members of the Saint Petersburg Academy of Sciences